This page lists the World Best Year Performance in the year 2006 in both the men's and the women's race walking distances: 20 km and 50 km (outdoor). One of the main events during this season were the 2006 European Athletics Championships in Gothenburg, Sweden.

Abbreviations
All times shown are in hours:minutes:seconds

Men's 20 km

Records

2006 World Year Ranking

Men's 50 km

Records

2006 World Year Ranking

Women's 20 km

Records

2006 World Year Ranking

References
IAAF

2006
Race Walking Year Ranking, 2006